Scott Reichner is a Republican member of the Montana Legislature.  He was elected to House District 9 which represents the Bigfork, Montana area.

On November 4, 2008, Reichner won the election and became a Republican member of Montana House of Representatives for District 9.

See also 
 Montana House of Representatives, District 9

References

External links 
 Scott Reichner at ballotpedia.org

Living people
Republican Party members of the Montana House of Representatives
People from Bigfork, Montana
Year of birth missing (living people)